Nandesari INA is a town and an industrial notified area in Vadodara district in the Indian state of Gujarat.

Demographics
 India census, Nandesari INA had a population of 2815. Males constitute 54% of the population and females 46%. Nandesari INA has an average literacy rate of 73%, higher than the national average of 59.5%: male literacy is 78%, and female literacy is 67%. In Nandesari INA, 17% of the population is under 6 years of age.

References

Cities and towns in Vadodara district